Uranyl oxalate (UO2C2O4) is a pale yellow powdered uranyl compound. It is often encountered in industrial nuclear processes at both the front and back-end of the nuclear fuel cycle. Due to its hygroscopicity, uranyl oxalate rarely exists in the dehydrated state and is usually instead found in the trihydrate form (UO2C2O4·3H2O) at room temperature. At room temperature, the powder exhibits a monoclinic crystal structure in the P21/c space group.

Production 
Uranyl oxalate trihydrate can be produced by the reaction of uranyl nitrate hexahydrate with oxalic acid.

Uranyl oxalate has been used in actinometers.

References 

Oxalates
Uranyl compounds